Ettore Beggiato (born 4 August 1954) is an Italian historian and politician.

As member of several Venetist political parties (Liga Veneta 1980–1987, Union of the Venetian People 1987–1995, Liga Veneta–Lega Nord 1995–1998, Liga Veneta Repubblica/Veneti d'Europa/Liga Fronte Veneto 1998–2004), he was member of the Regional Council of Veneto from 1985 to 2000. He was secretary of Liga Fronte Veneto from 2002 to 2004, when he joined the North-East Project, party of which he is currently member.

Beggiato is the author of many books about the history and the culture of Veneto such as 1866: The great swindle, about the referendum with which Veneto was united with Italy. He allegedly demonstrated it was not regular and not fairly democratic at all. For these reasons, Beggiato claims that Veneto is an independent nation and that it is necessary to re-celebrate it.

Notes

References
 Ettore Beggiato, La lotta dei Veneti contro lo stato italiano
 Ettore Beggiato, 1866:la grande truffa - Il plebiscito di annessione del Veneto all'Italia, Editoria Universitaria Venezia (2007)
 Ettore Beggiato, 1809: l’insorgenza veneta. La lotta contro Napoleone nella Terra di San Marco, Il Cerchio (2009) 
 Ettore Beggiato, L'unità divisa 1861 - 2011: parla l'Italia reale, Il Cerchio (2010) 
 Ettore Beggiato, Il Senno di poi - L'unità d'Italia vista 150 anni dopo, Il Cerchio (2011) 
 Ettore Beggiato, Lissa, l’ultima vittoria della Serenissima (20 luglio 1866), Il Cerchio (2012)

External links
 Homepage of Ettore Beggiato
 Ettore Beggiato - Venetist Patriot
 Veneto e venetismo oggi - rivista Etnie

Venetist politicians
Living people
1954 births
Members of the Regional Council of Veneto
20th-century Italian politicians
20th-century Italian male writers
21st-century Italian politicians
21st-century Italian historians
21st-century Italian male writers
20th-century Italian historians
Italian male non-fiction writers